The 1990 San Francisco Bay Blackhawks season was the club's first in the American Professional Soccer League and their second season overall. The Blackhawks finished 
in first place in their division and made a strong run in the playoffs, defeating the Colorado Foxes and the Los Angeles Heat to win the Western Conference. The APSL final ended 1-1, and the Maryland Bays prevailed over the Blackhawks on penalty kicks.

Squad
The 1990 squad

Competitions

APSL

Match results

Season

Playoffs 

* = Penalty kicks# = Series tied, 1-1. S. F. Bay wins mini-gameSource:

Standings

West (Western Soccer League) Conference

North Division

Points:
Win: 6
Shoot out win: 4
Shoot out loss: 2
1 bonus point per goal scored in regulation, maximum of 3 per game

References

External links
The Year in American Soccer – 1990 | APSL
San Francisco Bay Blackhawks Game Results | Soccerstats.us

American soccer clubs 1990 season
1990 in sports in California
San Francisco Bay Blackhawks